Trimeria is a genus of flowering plants belonging to the family Salicaceae.

Its native range is Africa.

Species:
 Trimeria grandifolia (Hochst.) Warb. 
 Trimeria trinervis Harv.

References

Salicaceae
Salicaceae genera